Hothat Dekha is a 2017 Bengali romantic drama film directed by Reshmi Mitra and Shahadat Hossain. The film was originally inspired by a poem of the same name by Tagore. It stars Debashree Roy, Ilias Kanchan, Deep Bhattacharya, Jannatul Sumaiya Heme, Sankar Chakraborty, Tulika Bose and Kartik Das Baul and Parthasarathi Deb. Jannatul Sumaiya Heme made debut with this movie. The music of the film was composed by Raja Narayan Deb. The film was shot in Chittagong.

References

External links 

Bengali-language Bangladeshi films
2017 films
2010s Bengali-language films